The men's middleweight (−84 kilograms) taekwondo event at the 2006 Asian Games took place on 9 December 2006 at Qatar SC Indoor Hall, Doha, Qatar.

A total of twelve competitors from twelve countries competed in this event, limited to fighters whose body weight was less than 84 kilograms.

Schedule
All times are Arabia Standard Time (UTC+03:00)

Results 
Legend
K — Won by knockout
R — Won by referee stop contest

References
Results

External links
Official website

Taekwondo at the 2006 Asian Games